Cass County is a county located in the U.S. state of Iowa. As of the 2020 census, the population was 13,127. Its county seat is Atlantic.  It was named to honor Lewis Cass, who was the 1848 Democratic nominee for president.

History
Cass County is named in honor of Lewis Cass, a Michigan senator and an unsuccessful Democratic candidate for the presidency in 1848.  The county was established within its present boundaries in 1851 and originated in 1853. Religious persecution was responsible for bringing the first people of European ancestry to Cass County.  The Mormons, fleeing from Illinois, were the earliest settlers, and established a community at Indiantown in 1846.

At Indiantown, two of the three commissioners selected to locate a county seat were chosen.  The site they chose was one mile (1.6 km) from Indiantown and named Lewis.  Most of the people and businesses in Indian Town moved to Lewis shortly after it was laid out.  In 1856, a frame courthouse was built, and eight years later a small stone building was completed for the county treasurer's office. In 1857, there was an attempt to relocate the county seat to Grove City; it was unsuccessful.  On October 20, 1869, after a due canvass of the vote on the re-location of the county seat, the Board declared the city of Atlantic the county seat and ordered the county officers to that place.

In 1872, the first courthouse built in Atlantic was completed.  Until it was completed county offices were held in various empty buildings. Ten years later the county built its second courthouse at Atlantic.  The $65,000 building was destroyed by a fire in 1932.  The fire started in the clock tower and gutted all of the second floor.  Most of the county records and equipment were saved.

The present, fourth, courthouse was completed in 1934.  While it was being built, county offices were located in the Atlantic Motors building, where an attempted robbery of the treasurer's safe took place.  The robbers were interrupted and escaped, but without any money.  The final cost of the fourth courthouse was $130,000: $65,000 came from a  county bond issue, $46,500 from insurance and the remaining was covered by a Public Works Administration federal grant.  The concrete and brick building is three stories high.  It was dedicated on December 26, 1934, with the main speaker being the Governor of Iowa, Clyde L. Herring. The Board of Supervisors approved a new jail addition, which was dedicated in 1984.

Geography

Major highways

 Interstate 80
 U.S. Highway 6
 U.S. Highway 71
 Iowa Highway 48
 Iowa Highway 83
 Iowa Highway 92
 Iowa Highway 148
 Iowa Highway 173

Transit
 List of intercity bus stops in Iowa

Adjacent counties
Audubon County  (north)
Adair County  (east)
Adams County  (southeast)
Montgomery County  (southwest)
Pottawattamie County  (west)
Shelby County  (northwest)

Other Geographical notes
Due to its proximity to Cass County, Nebraska, and because both of those counties receive most of their broadcasts from Omaha, Nebraska, references to 'Cass County' must be frequently disambiguated, or result in confusion.

Demographics

2020 census
There were 6,398 housing units of which 5,818 were occupied.

2010 census
There were 6,591 housing units, of which 5,980 were occupied.

2000 census

As of the census of 2000, there were 14,684 people, 6,120 households, and 4,094 families residing in the county.  The population density was 26 people per square mile (10/km2).  There were 6,590 housing units at an average density of 12 per square mile (5/km2).  The racial makeup of the county was 98.84% White, 0.21% Black or African American, 0.12% Native American, 0.14% Asian, 0.04% Pacific Islander, 0.31% from other races, and 0.34% from two or more races.  0.69% of the population were Hispanic or Latino of any race.

There were 6,120 households, out of which 29.30% had children under the age of 18 living with them, 56.60% were married couples living together, 7.20% had a female householder with no husband present, and 33.10% were non-families. 29.80% of all households were made up of individuals, and 15.90% had someone living alone who was 65 years of age or older.  The average household size was 2.32 and the average family size was 2.87.

In the county, the population was spread out, with 23.80% under the age of 18, 6.80% from 18 to 24, 24.80% from 25 to 44, 23.80% from 45 to 64, and 20.80% who were 65 years of age or older.  The median age was 42 years. For every 100 females there were 94.30 males.  For every 100 females age 18 and over, there were 90.20 males.

The median income for a household in the county was $32,922, and the median income for a family was $40,564. Males had a median income of $29,736 versus $20,108 for females. The per capita income for the county was $17,067.  About 7.20% of families and 11.10% of the population were below the poverty line, including 14.40% of those under age 18 and 10.10% of those age 65 or over.

Notable people
Edwin Perkins, inventor of Kool-Aid
Ed Podolak, a former running back for Kansas City Chiefs
Earl Caddock, a champion amateur and pro wrestler of the 1910s and early 1920s.
Steve H. Hanke, professor of applied economics at Johns Hopkins University, adviser to presidents, currency reformer, and commodity and currency trader

Communities

Cities

Anita
Atlantic
Cumberland
Griswold
Lewis
Marne
Massena
Wiota

Townships
Cass County is divided into sixteen townships:

 Bear Grove
 Benton
 Brighton
 Cass
 Edna
 Franklin
 Grant
 Grove
 Lincoln
 Massena
 Noble
 Pleasant
 Pymosa
 Union
 Victoria
 Washington

Population ranking
The population ranking of the following table is based on the 2020 census of Cass County. 
† county seat

Politics

Cass County has historically been one of the most solidly Republican counties in Iowa. The only Democrat ever to win the county was Franklin D. Roosevelt in his 1932 landslide, and even he couldn't keep it in his column 4 years later when he won an even larger victory.

See also

National Register of Historic Places listings in Cass County, Iowa
The Cass County Courthouse Article

References

External links

County website

 
1851 establishments in Iowa
Populated places established in 1851